Farm Animal refers to livestock.

Farm Animal or Farm Animals may also refer to:
Farm Animal Rights Movement, an international nonprofit organization working to promote a vegan lifestyle and animal rights through public education and grass roots outreach with headquarters in Bethesda, Maryland
Farm Animal Welfare Committee (FAWC), an independent advisory body established by the Government of Great Britain in 2011

Animals
Mammals

Alpaca
Asian small-clawed otter
Bactrian camel
Cat
Capybara
Cattle
Common degu
Deer
Dog
Domestic yak
Donkey
European mole
Goat
Guinea pig
Hamster
Hedgehog
Horse
Llama
Meerkat
Mule
Pig
Rabbit
Raccoon
Sheep
Skunk
Zebu

Birds

Common barn owl
Chicken
Duck
Emu
Goose
Macaw
Ostrich
Pigeon
Turkey_(bird)

See also
Digital Farm Animals, real name Nicholas Gale, an English DJ, record producer, singer, songwriter and remixer
Animal Farm (disambiguation)